Sayyid Ashraf 'Ali Khan Bahadur (before 1759 – 24 March 1770), was Nawab Nazim of Bengal and Bihar. He was the fourth son of Mir Jafar.

Life
He was adopted by his aunt, Nafisat un-Nisa Begum Sahiba (Manjhli Begum). On 11 March 1770, he was proclaimed as Nawab Nazim of Bengal and Bihar on the death of his elder brother Najabat Ali Khan. He was formally installed on the Khahar Balish, at Murshidabad Fort, 21 March 1770.

But shortly he died of smallpox, at Murshidabad Fort, 24 March 1770.

See also
 Nawabs of Bengal
 List of rulers of Bengal
 History of Bengal
 History of Bangladesh
 History of India
 Shia Islam in India

External links

1770 deaths
Year of birth unknown
Nawabs of Bengal
18th-century Indian monarchs